USS LST-871 was an  in the United States Navy. Like many of her class, she was not named and is properly referred to by her hull designation.

Construction
LST-871 was laid down on 9 November 1944, at Jeffersonville, Indiana, by the Jeffersonville Boat & Machinery Co.; launched on 20 December 1944; and commissioned on 18 January 1945.

Service history
During World War II LST-871 was assigned to the Asiatic-Pacific theater.

LST-871 was redesignated LSTH-871 on 15 September 1945. Following World War II, LSTH-871 performed occupation duty in the Far East until early May 1946. She returned to the United States and was decommissioned on 4 October 1946 and struck from the Navy list on 13 November that same year. On 30 June 1948, the ship was sold to the Humble Oil & Refining Co. in Houston, Texas, for operation.

The ship's wartime commanding officer, Frank W. Summers, USNR, was promoted to lieutenant commander by the end of his command, and later served as Chief Justice of the Louisiana Supreme Court.

Citations

Bibliography

External links
 

 

1944 ships
LST-542-class tank landing ships
Ships built in Jeffersonville, Indiana
World War II amphibious warfare vessels of the United States